A log cabin is a small house built from logs.

Log cabin may also refer to:

Places and historic sites
Log Cabin, Texas, a city in Henderson County, U.S.
Log Cabin (Oak Park Heights, Minnesota), U.S.
Log Cabin (Bellevue, Nebraska), U.S.
Log Cabin (University of Pittsburgh), Pennsylvania, U.S.
The Log Cabin, later Pod's and Jerry's, a cabaret and jazz club in Harlem, New York City, U.S.

Other uses
Log Cabin Republicans, an American gay and lesbian political organization
Log Cabin syrup, an American brand of pre-packaged syrups
Log Cabin Wilderness Camp, a Boy Scout camp in the Inyo National Forest on the site of the Log Cabin Gold Mine
Log Cabin, a Whig Party newspaper later merged into the New-York Tribune

See also

Log house, a larger, less rustic type of log home
Log cabin campaign of William Henry Harrison in the 1840 U.S. presidential election